

The Beets Special was a single-seat recreational aircraft built in the United States in the mid-1970s with the intention of marketing it for homebuilding. It was a parasol-wing monoplane of conventional configuration with fixed tailwheel undercarriage.

The single prototype (registration N711GB) was constructed by Glen Beets who was working as a welder for Lou Stolp at the time.  He based his general design on the Stolp Starduster biplane, which was being offered to the homebuilt aircraft market at the time.  Plans for the Beets Special were marketed by Stolp's company at one time.

Specifications

References

 
 
 aerofiles.com

1970s United States sport aircraft
Homebuilt aircraft
High-wing aircraft
Single-engined tractor aircraft
Aircraft manufactured in the United States
Aircraft first flown in 1973